In mathematics, in the phase portrait of a dynamical system, a heteroclinic orbit (sometimes called a heteroclinic connection) is a path in phase space which joins two different equilibrium points. If the equilibrium points at the start and end of the orbit are the same, the orbit is a homoclinic orbit.

Consider the continuous dynamical system described by the ODE

and

Symbolic dynamics
By using the Markov partition, the long-time behaviour of hyperbolic system can be studied using the techniques of symbolic dynamics. In this case, a heteroclinic orbit has a particularly simple and clear representation. Suppose that  is a finite set of M symbols. The dynamics of a point x is then represented by a bi-infinite string of symbols 

A periodic point of the system is simply a recurring sequence of letters. A heteroclinic orbit is then the joining of two distinct periodic orbits. It may be written as

The notation  simply denotes the repetition of p an infinite number of times. Thus, a heteroclinic orbit can be understood as the transition from one periodic orbit to another. By contrast, a homoclinic orbit can be written as 

with the intermediate sequence  being non-empty, and, of course, not being p, as otherwise, the orbit would simply be .

See also 

 Heteroclinic connection
 Heteroclinic cycle
 Heteroclinic bifurcation
 Homoclinic orbit
 Traveling wave

References 

 John Guckenheimer and Philip Holmes, Nonlinear Oscillations, Dynamical Systems, and Bifurcations of Vector Fields, (Applied Mathematical Sciences Vol. 42), Springer

Dynamical systems